The Chouan Army of Rennes and Fougères (Armée des Chouans de Rennes et Fougères or armée royale de Rennes et de Fougères) was a French counter-revolutionary army established in 1795 by Joseph de Puisaye, who passed on its command to Aimé Picquet du Boisguy, head of the Chouans in the area from 1793 onwards.  It merged the Royalist divisions from Ille-et-Vilaine and some from Côtes d'Armor. His influence also extended to some areas of Mayenne in Maine, and Manche in Normandy. After 1796 its influence declined and, from 1799, it was limited to Ille-et-Vilaine alone.

Divisions (1794-1796) 
In 1796, these divisions were under the direction of Joseph de Puisaye and assisted by Boisguy, but whose real command did not have time to be effective. The Fougères division numbered 3,000 men, that of Vitré 1,500, the 8 others were about 7,000 men strong in total.

 Catholic and Royal Army of Brittany and Company of Catholic Knights Lieutenant-General: Joseph de Puisaye  Major-General: René Augustin de Chalus
 Army of Rennes and Fougères   Brigadier: Aimé Picquet du Boisguy
 1st division, Fougères, 3000 men   Colonel: Aimé Picquet du Boisguy, then   Colonel: Auguste Hay de Bonteville

Military units and formations established in 1795
Counter-revolutionary military units and formations of France